Oregocerata quadrifurcata is a species of moth of the family Tortricidae. It is found in Colombia.

The length of the forewings is about 9 mm. The ground colour of the forewings is pale greyish brown in the basal area, tinged with pale yellowish brown in the remaining portion of the wing. The hindwings are cream, but lighter towards the base and with weak strigulation (fine streaks) in the terminal area.

Etymology
The species name refers to the somewhat quadrifurcate (four branched) tip of the uncus.

References

Moths described in 2005
Euliini